P. Mitchell Murphy (born October 28, 1962) is a retired Canadian educator and former politician in the province of Prince Edward Island.  He was a member of the Legislative Assembly of Prince Edward Island from 1996 to 2007. He is a member of the Progressive Conservative Party.

Career

Murphy was born in Kensington, Prince Edward Island, the son of Earle and Donna Murphy. A graduate of the University of Prince Edward Island with a graduate degree in education from Saint Mary's University, he served in the PEI Cabinet in a variety of different positions: Minister of Community Affairs and Attorney General (1996–98), Minister Responsible for Acadian and Francophone Affairs (1996–2003), Minister of Technology and Environment (1998–2000), Provincial Treasurer (2003–07), Minister Responsible for the Public Service Commission (2003–07), Minister Responsible for the PEI Harness Racing Commission (2003–07). In 2007, Murphy was reprimanded in the legislature for failing to disclose that he was a shareholder in his father's company. He was defeated when he ran for reelection in 2007.

Personal life
Murphy lives in Kensington with his wife Anne Marie (née Aylward) and two daughters, Emily and Mairead.

References

1962 births
Living people
People from Prince County, Prince Edward Island
University of Prince Edward Island alumni
Progressive Conservative Party of Prince Edward Island MLAs
Saint Mary's University (Halifax) alumni
Members of the Executive Council of Prince Edward Island
21st-century Canadian politicians
Finance ministers of Prince Edward Island